Defluviimonas nitratireducens is a Gram-negative, short-rod-shaped and non-motile bacterium from the genus of Defluviimonas which has been isolated from seawater from the Dalian Bay.

References

External links
Type strain of Defluviimonas nitratireducens at BacDive -  the Bacterial Diversity Metadatabase

Rhodobacteraceae
Bacteria described in 2017